The Battle of Bantry Bay was a naval engagement fought on 11 May 1689, a week before the declaration of the Nine Years' War. The English fleet was commanded by Admiral Arthur Herbert, created Earl of Torrington after the Battle; the French fleet by  François Louis de Rousselet, Marquis de Châteaurenault. Apart from the inshore operations at La Rochelle in 1627–28, the Battle of Bantry Bay was the first time English and French navies had met in fleet action since 1545.

The battle near the southern Irish coast was somewhat inconclusive but the French, endeavouring to supply King James II in his attempt to re-establish his throne, had managed to unload their supplies for James's Irish campaign. But although the French failed to follow up their tactical success with strategic gain, Châteaurenault had inflicted considerable damage on the English fleet.

Background
Following the 'Glorious Revolution' in 1688, James II of England lost his throne to William, Prince of Orange. The new William III reigned jointly with his wife Mary. James fled to France and was given succour by his co-religionist, Louis XIV, but was determined to regain his throne. In this endeavour Louis was willing to support James, primarily for two reasons: firstly, he fervently believed in the Stuart king’s God-ordained right to the English throne; secondly, and primarily, the war in Ireland would divert William's energy and forces away from the Spanish Netherlands, a theatre which would later become the main focus for both William's and Louis's efforts during the conflict.

While in France, James built up an army to support his Lord Deputy in Ireland, the Earl of Tyrconnell. James had already sent financial help, but it was not until March 1689 that he was ready to sail in person to lead the campaign. After landing in Kinsale with 100 French officers and about 2,500 mixed troops, James, together with Tyrconnell – whom he now made a duke – travelled to Dublin. James hoped to quickly establish control over Ireland before pressing on to Scotland or England, but this was impossible while Protestant strongholds in northern Ireland remained outside his control. The campaign, therefore, urgently required supplies and equipment from France, but English Parliamentarians, acutely worried of the situation developing in Ireland, were determined to use the Royal Navy and frustrate James’s designs.

Battle

The newly appointed commander-in-chief of the English main fleet, Arthur Herbert, did not go to sea until the beginning of April, leaving behind a number of ships which had mutinied for overdue pay. Herbert's fleet of 19 ships sailed on 4 April; it was off Cork by 12 April, seeking to intercept enemy vessels. The French fleet, consisting of 24 third- and fourth-rate vessels, two frigates, a number of fireships, and transports carrying weapons and supplies for James’s campaign, left the port of Brest on 6 May.

As the French approached southern Ireland Herbert's squadron had made offloading supplies at Kinsale impossible, thus forcing Châteaurenault to anchor his fleet in Bantry Bay, joining up with a further three French frigates there. The following morning on 11 May, as the French were landing 1,500 men with money, arms and ammunition, Admiral Herbert’s fleet came into view. The French weighed anchor, and a running battle ensued in the confined waters of the bay. Initially the two fleets opposed each other in parallel lines but Châteaurenault, enjoying the weather gage, drove Herbert from the bay into the open sea. The ensuing battle – which in total lasted four hours – was somewhat inconclusive, but the French had protected the transports which managed to unload. When the French broke off the action late in the afternoon in order to return to the anchorage, Herbert's ships were too damaged to follow, and he had suffered many casualties.

Ships involved

The French squadron comprised:
 François 48, Capt. Pannetier
 Vermandois 60, Capt. de Machault
 Duc 50, Capt. Colbert-Saint-Mars
 Fendant 52, Capt. de Réals
 Saint Michel 56, Chef d'escadre Jean Gabaret
 Fort 56, Capt. le chevalier de Rosmadec
 Léger 40, Capt. le chevalier de Forbis
 Précieux 52, Capt de Salanpart
 Capable 48, Capt. de Bellefontaine
 Arrogant 58, Capt de la Harteloire
 Diamant 54, Capt. le chevalier de Coëtlogon
 Ardent 66, Capt. Desnos Champmeslin (flagship of Lieutenant-général Louis François de Rousselet, comte de Châteaurenault)
 Furieux 60, Capt. Desnos
 Faucon 40, Capt le chevalier d'Hervault
 Modéré 50, Capt. le marquis de Saint-Hermine
 Entreprenant 56, Capt. de Beaujeu
 Courageux 56, Chef d'escadre Job Forant
 Neptune 46, Capt. de Pallière
 Arc en Ciel 44, Capt. de Perrinet
 Excellent 60, Capt. de Lavigerie
 Sage 52, Capt. de Vaudricourt
 Oiseau 40, Capt. Duquesne Guition
 Emporté 42, Capt. Roussel
 Apollon 56, Capt. Montortier

There were also 5 frigates and 10 fireships.

The English squadron comprised:
 Defiance 64, Capt. John Ashby
 Portsmouth 46, Capt. George St Loe
 Plymouth 60, Capt. Richard Carter
 Ruby 48, Capt. Frederick Froud
 Diamond 48, Capt. Benjamin Walters
 Advice 48, Capt. John Granville
 Mary 62, Capt. Matthew Aylmer
 Saint Albans 50, Capt. John Layton
 Edgar 64, Capt. Clowdisley Shovell
 Elizabeth 70, Capt. David Mitchell (flagship of Admiral Arthur Herbert)
 Pendennis 70, Capt. George Churchill
 Portland 50, Capt. George Aylmer
 Deptford 54, Capt. George Rooke
 Woolwich 54, Capt. Ralph Sanderson
 Dartmouth 36, Capt. Thomas Ley
 Greenwich 54. Capt. Christopher Billopp
 Cambridge 70, Capt. John Clements
 Antelope 48, Capt. Henry Wickham
 York 60, Capt. Ralph Delavall

 There were also 2 bomb vessels (Firedrake and Salamander) 
and a fireship (previously HMY Saudadoes -re-commissioned as HMS Soldado) commanded by John Graydon (c.1666–1726).

Aftermath

The fleets withdrew: Château-Renault returned to Brest on 18 May, seizing on the way seven Dutch merchant vessels bound from the West Indies. Herbert sailed for the Scilly Isles, before reaching Spithead, via Plymouth, on 22 May. For both the French and English however, the battle was equally unsatisfactory. Although the damage sustained to Herbert’s ships was enough to lay his squadron up for two months in Portsmouth (during which time the Irish waters were completely uncovered), Châteaurenault failed to press his advantage – much to the dismay of his junior flag-officers, Job Forant and Jean Gabaret. King William was also unsatisfied with the outcome; nevertheless, he created Herbert Earl of Torrington, mainly in recognition of his work the previous year during the 'Glorious Revolution'. Moreover, the King knighted two of Herbert’s captains, John Ashby who had led the van, and Cloudesley Shovell, and ordered a gratuity of ten shillings a head for the seamen. James, meanwhile, had begun the Siege of Derry, the capture of which would open communications with Jacobite forces in Scotland; three French frigates under Captain Duquesne were assigned to support him. In response, the Scottish parliament commissioned two small cruisers, the Pelican and the Janet to oppose the French squadron, but, on 20 July, they were both taken by Duquesne in the North Channel.

The Allies now began to build up their naval strength in the Channel; the fleet would soon comprise 34 English and 20 Dutch ships of the line, with four frigates and 17 fireships. After rendezvousing with victuallers, the Anglo-Dutch squadrons patrolled south of Kinsale to prevent further French supplies reaching Ireland. However, when the French Brest fleet – now joined by Tourville’s squadron of 20 rated vessels and four frigates – set sail on 15 August, it cruised in the Bay of Biscay, posing no threat to England or English communications with Ireland. The French, therefore, were unable to prevent Admiral Rooke relieving the siege of Londonderry on 10 August, or, forestall Marshal Schomberg's army from England landing near Carrickfergus on 23 August. With Schomberg's reinforcements, the Williamite army opposing James in Ireland now amounted to some 40,000 troops.

Notes

References
 Aubrey, Philip.  The Defeat of James Stuart’s Armada 1692. Leicester University Press, (1979). 
 Lynn, John A. The Wars of Louis XIV, 1667–1714. Longman, (1999). 
 Kinross, John. The Boyne and Aughrim: The War of the Two Kings. The Windrush Press, (1998). 
 Roger N.A.M. The Command of the Ocean: A Naval History of Britain 1649–1815, Penguin Group, (2006). 
 Weigley, Russell The Age of Battles: The Quest for Decisive Warfare from Breitenfeld to Waterloo, Indiana University Press, (2004). 
 Tunstall, B. Naval Warfare in the Age of Sail: The Evolution of Fighting Tactics, 1650-1815. Conway Maritime, (2001). 

1689 in France
1689 in Ireland
Naval battles of the Nine Years' War
Naval battles involving France
Naval battles involving England
Conflicts in 1689